Al rahman is the 55th chapter (surah) of the Qur'an.

Al rahman, Ar rahman, or other forms may also refer to:

Mosques
 Ar-Rahman Mosque (Aleppo), Syria
 Al-Rahman Mosque, Baghdad, Iraq
 Ar-Rahman Mosque (Pyongyang), North Korea
 Al-Rahman Mosque, Kuala Lumpur, Malaysia
 Ar-Rahma Mosque, Kyiv, Ukraine
 Al-Rahma Mosque, Liverpool, United Kingdom

Other
Al-Rahman Legion, or al-Rahman Corps, an Islamist Syrian rebel group

See also
Rahman (disambiguation)
Rahman (name)
Abd al-Rahman, a name